Eric Viscaal (born 20 March 1968) is a former football player from the Netherlands, who played much of his career as a forward in Belgium (Beveren, KAA Gent, KV Mechelen). He earned five caps for the Dutch national team and was part of their squad at UEFA Euro 1992. Viscaal won the Young Professional Footballer of the Year award for the 1988–89 season.

Honours

Club
PSV
 Eredivisie (2): 1986–87, 1987–88
 KNVB Cup (1): 1987–88
 European Cup (1): 1987–88

Grasshopper
 Swiss Super League (1): 1995–96

Notes
In 1989 he was chosen Young Professional of the Year.
In the 1992/93-season during the match Cercle Brugge - KAA Gent the goalkeeper of Gent was sent off the pitch with a red card. Cercle Brugge was granted a penalty kick. Gent was out of substitutes so Viscaal was sent to the goal and stopped the penalty kicked by Josip Weber.  A minute later a penalty kick was given to Gent. Viscaal walked to the other end of the pitch and scored the equalizer. The final score being in the final seconds: 1 - 1.

References

External links

Career stats at Voetbal International 

1968 births
Living people
Association football forwards
Dutch footballers
Dutch expatriate footballers
Netherlands international footballers
Netherlands under-21 international footballers
Eredivisie players
Belgian Pro League players
Swiss Super League players
PSV Eindhoven players
De Graafschap players
K.S.K. Beveren players
K.A.A. Gent players
Grasshopper Club Zürich players
K.V. Mechelen players
UEFA Euro 1992 players
Expatriate footballers in Belgium
Expatriate footballers in Switzerland
Dutch expatriate sportspeople in Belgium
Dutch expatriate sportspeople in Switzerland
Footballers from Eindhoven
Outfield association footballers who played in goal